This article lists census-designated places (CDPs) in the U.S. state of Minnesota. As of 2018, there were a total of 50 census-designated places in Minnesota. Arnold ceased to exist with the incorporation of the city of Rice Lake and Oakport was annexed by Moorhead, both in 2015.

Census-designated places

See also
 List of cities in Minnesota
 List of counties in Minnesota

References

 
Minnesota
Census-designated places